Taras Petrivskyi (born 3 February 1984, Stryi, Lviv Oblast, Ukrainian SSR, Soviet Union) is a professional Ukrainian football defender who plays for FC Nyva Ternopil in the Ukrainian First League.

External links
 Profile on Official Karpaty Lviv Website
 Profile at FFU Official Website (Ukr)

1984 births
Living people
Ukrainian footballers
Ukrainian Premier League players
FC Karpaty Lviv players
FC Nyva Ternopil players
FC Volgar Astrakhan players
Ukrainian expatriate footballers
Expatriate footballers in Russia
Ukrainian expatriate sportspeople in Russia
People from Stryi
Association football defenders
Sportspeople from Lviv Oblast